Major General Emmett R. Titshaw, Jr. is a retired officer in the United States Air Force and the Air National Guard of the United States. He was the acting director of the Air National Guard from 17 November 2008 to 2 February 2009. He later served the Adjutant General for the State of Florida until his retirement from military service in March 2015.

Awards and decorations

Flight Information
 Rating: Command Pilot
 Flight Hours: More than 4,500
 Aircraft flown: F-15, F-16, C-131, F-106, F-102, T-38, T-37
 Pilot wings from: Columbus Air Force Base, Mississippi

Assignments
 November 1970 – February 1972, Student, Undergraduate Pilot Training, 3650th Pilot Training Wing, Columbus Air Force Base, Mississippi
 February 1972 – February 1979, Pilot, 159th Fighter Interceptor Squadron, Jacksonville Air National Guard Base/Jacksonville International Airport, Florida
 February 1979 – June 1984, Air Operations Officer, 125th Fighter Interceptor Group, Jacksonville ANGB/Jacksonville International Airport, Florida
 June 1984 – April 1988, Flight Commander, F-106, 159th Fighter Interceptor Squadron, Jacksonville ANGB/Jacksonville International Airport, Florida
 April 1987 – April 1988, Operations Officer, 159th Fighter Interceptor Squadron, Jacksonville ANGB/Jacksonville International Airport, Florida
 April 1988 – November 1989, Commander, 159th Fighter Interceptor Squadron, Jacksonville ANGB/Jacksonville International Airport, Florida
 December 1989 – May 1990, Deputy Commander for Operations, 125th Fighter Interceptor Group, Jacksonville ANGB/Jacksonville International Airport, Florida
 May 1990 – May 1991, Commander, 125th Fighter Interceptor Group, Jacksonville ANGB/Jacksonville International Airport, Florida
 May 1991 – May 1995, Director of Operations, Headquarters, Florida Air National Guard, St. Francis Barracks, Saint Augustine, Florida
 May 1995 – July 2001, Chief of Staff, Headquarters, Florida Air National Guard, St. Francis Barracks, Saint Augustine, Florida
 August 2001 – July 2006, Assistant Adjutant General-Air, Florida National Guard, St. Francis Barracks, Saint Augustine, Florida
 August 2006 – June 2008, Air National Guard Assistant to Commander, Air Combat Command, Langley Air Force Base, Virginia
 June 2008 – November 2008, Special Assistant to the Director, Air National Guard, Arlington, Virginia
 November 2008 – January 2009, Acting Director, Air National Guard, Arlington, Virginia
 January 2009 – June 2010, Special Assistant to the Director, Air National Guard, National Guard Bureau, Arlington, Virginia
 June 2010 – March 2015, The Adjutant General, Florida, Florida Joint Force Headquarters, St. Francis Barracks, St. Augustine, Florida

References

External links

 Maj. MAJOR GENERAL EMMETT R. TITSHAW, JR. United States Air Force Bio

Year of birth missing (living people)
National Guard (United States) generals
United States Air Force generals
Recipients of the Air Force Distinguished Service Medal
Recipients of the Humanitarian Service Medal
Recipients of the Legion of Merit
Recipients of the Meritorious Service Medal (United States)
Living people